Lashkajan-e Sofla (also Romanized as Lashkājān-e Soflá and Lashkā Jān-e Soflá; also known as Lashkā Jān-e Pāīn) is a village in Reza Mahalleh Rural District, in the Central District of Rudsar County, Gilan Province, Iran. At the 2006 census, its population was 570, in 191 families.

References 

Populated places in Rudsar County